Kardi may refer to:

Kardi, Iran, a village in Zanjan Province, Iran
Kardi, another name for safflower
Kardinal Offishall, a hip-hop musician

See also
Cardi
Cardie (disambiguation)